The Râul Mare (in its upper course also: Canciu) is the right headwater of the river Cugir in Romania. At its confluence with the Râul Mic in the town Cugir, the river Cugir is formed.

Tributaries
The following rivers are tributaries to the Râul Mare (from source to mouth):
Left: Zănoaga, Boșorog, Preluca, Moliviș, Chicera, Răchita, Brustura
Right: Prisaca, Păltinei, Izvorul Căldării, Tomnatecu

References

Rivers of Romania
Rivers of Alba County